Skruf Snus AB is a Swedish manufacturer of snus. They were founded in 2002 and launched their first products in 2003.

In 2005, Imperial Tobacco acquired 43.5% of the shares in Skruf Snus AB. ITG now owns Skruf Snus after having acquired the remaining shares in July 2008.

With Skruf as its leading brand, Imperial Tobacco had a 40% market share in Norway in 2017.

References

External links 
 

Snus
Swedish brands
Imperial Brands
Tobacco companies of Sweden
Tobacco brands
2002 establishments in Sweden
Companies established in 2002